Fraxel Laser Treatment is a line of lasers developed by Reliant Technologies in 2004. It was developed from a US patent licensed from the Wellman Center for Photomedicine. R. Rox Anderson was the inventor. Fraxel lasers cause fractional photothermolysis for skin resurfacing.

Complications observed in a study of 961 fractional laser treatments included acne and herpes outbreaks. There have also been anecdotal negative accounts of bad scarring and hyperpigmentation following the use of Fraxel lasers.

Treatment purposes 
Fraxel laser is used primarily to rejuvenate skin due to its collagen boosting qualities. It is used to treat hyperpigmentation, dark spots, and superficial signs of aging such as fine lines and wrinkles, as well as acne scarring.

References

 Hantash BM, Bedi VP, Kapadia B, Rahman Z, Jiang K, Tanner H, Chan KF, Zachary CB (2007) , Lasers Surg Med. 2007 Feb;39(2):96-107.
 Hantash BM, Chan KF (2012) , US Patent 8,323,253, filed February 22, 2008.
 Chan KF, DeBenedictis LC (2013) , US Patent 8,435,234, filed November 7, 2007.
 Chan KF, Hantash BM, Herron GS, Bedi VP, (2014) , US Patent 8,690,863, filed October 10, 2006.
 Elizabeth L. Tanzi, Rungsima Wanitphakdeedecha, Tina S. Alster (November–December 2008). Fraxel Laser Indications and Long-Term Follow-Up, Aesthetic Surgery Journal, vol 28, Issue 6, pp. 675–678. Accessed June 19, 2010

Laser medicine